Haddenham Airfield was an airfield on the outskirts of the English village of Haddenham, Buckinghamshire.

Originally a Second World War airfield called RAF Thame it later came under civil owners Airtech Limited who were based there until the 1990s.

History
The site was originally RAF Thame.

The following units were posted there at some point:
 No. 1 Glider Training School RAF.
 No. 2 Glider Training School RAF.
 No. 5 (Training) Ferry Pool RAF.
 No. 12 Operational Training Unit RAF.
 ATA Initial Flying Training School.
 ATA (Training) Ferry Pool.
 Glider Instructors School RAF.
 Glider Training Squadron RAF.

Current use

In 1965 the airfield started gliding operations run by the Upward Bound Trust.

The Upward Bound Trust is a charity that provides glider training for those over the age of 16. With the building of an industrial estate the trust held a hangar appeal supported by the local community of Haddenham, it raised enough money to build a new hangar and a new access road.

References

Gliding in England
Airports in England
Airports in South East England